The River and Death (Spanish: El río y la muerte) is a 1954 Mexican film. It was written by Luis Alcoriza and directed by Luis Buñuel.

Cast
 Columba Domínguez – Mercedes
 Miguel Torruco – Felipe Anguiano
 Joaquín Cordero – Gerardo Anguiano
 Jaime Fernández – Romulo Menchaca
 Víctor Alcocer – Polo Menchaca
 Silvia Derbez – Elsa
 José Elías Moreno – Don Nemesio
 Carlos Martínez Baena – Don Julian
 Alfredo Varela – Chinelas (as Alfredo Varela Jr.)
 Miguel Manzano – don Anselmo

Background
The film adaptation of a novel about a blood revenge that has lasted for several generations is so country-specific that the audience at the Venice Film Festival thought it was a comedy. Buñuel takes great pains in his autobiography to show that the despicable events portrayed in the film were even surpassed by reality.

References

Bibliography
 Goble, Alan. The Complete Index to Literary Sources in Film. Walter de Gruyter, 1999.

External links
 

1955 films
1955 drama films
Mexican drama films
1950s Spanish-language films
Films directed by Luis Buñuel
Mexican black-and-white films
Films set in Mexico
1950s Mexican films